Kyauktada Township is the center of downtown Yangon, Myanmar. The township consists of nine wards, and shares borders with Botataung Township in the east, Seikkan Township and Yangon River in the south, Pabedan Township in the west and Mingala Taungnyunt Township in the north.

The township is home to many historic buildings, including the Sule Pagoda, the City Hall, the High Court Building, the Strand Hotel as well as embassies of the UK and India. Three of the tallest buildings in Yangon, the Traders Hotel (now Sule Shangri-La), the Sakura Tower, and the Center Point Tower are located in Kyauktada. Many government offices are headquartered here. Maha Bandula Park across from Sule Pagoda and the city hall is a major recreational area in the downtown area.

The township has five primary schools, one middle school and one high school. Many of its school children attend high schools in nearby townships of Botataung and Pabedan.

Landmarks
As Kyauktada township was part of the original city plan implemented by the British, it is dotted with many colonial era buildings, including 39 landmark buildings and structures protected by the city.

References

Townships of Yangon